The 1953 Southern 500, the fourth running of the event, was a NASCAR Grand National Series event that was held on September 7, 1953, at Darlington Raceway in Darlington, South Carolina.

Junior Johnson would make his NASCAR Cup Series debut in this event; amongst a long list of other rookie drivers. Bob Weatherly, Lonnie Bragg, and Elmer Cooper would race their only NASCAR event here along with several others. " Just months prior to the 1953 running of the Southern 500, the shape of the track made passing opportunities very few. A reconstruction helped to mold the racetrack into a fast venue for stock car racing prior to the completion of Daytona International Speedway.

Along with this track, almost every track in the Southeastern United States had a weekly racing series. During the 1950s, regular passenger cars were not so different from the cars that the NASCAR drivers used at the races. The gulf between everyday passenger vehicles and NASCAR vehicles started to widen in the mid-1970s due to environmental concerns; becoming pronounced by the late-1970s.

Background
Darlington Raceway, nicknamed by many NASCAR fans and drivers as "The Lady in Black" or "The Track Too Tough to Tame" and advertised as a "NASCAR Tradition", is a race track built for NASCAR racing located near Darlington, South Carolina. It is of a unique, somewhat egg-shaped design, an oval with the ends of very different configurations, a condition which supposedly arose from the proximity of one end of the track to a minnow pond the owner refused to relocate. This situation makes it very challenging for the crews to set up their cars' handling in a way that will be effective at both ends.

The track is a four-turn  oval. The track's first two turns are banked at twenty-five degrees, while the final two turns are banked two degrees lower at twenty-three degrees. The front stretch (the location of the finish line) and the back stretch is banked at six degrees. Darlington Raceway can seat up to 60,000 people.

Race report
A grand total of 59 American drivers competed in this 364-lap event. Due to irregularities in the way that early NASCAR events were recorded, two drivers were recorded as starting in 19th place. Further irregularities would ensue when Elmer Cooper and Bobby Myers ended up jointly qualifying for the race in 50th place. Lloyd Hulette's car number was actually 7777 but since NASCAR didn't seem to allow three-digit numbers at Darlington, much less four, he was scored as 7.

Dick Passwater would make his final NASCAR Grand National Series appearance in this race. Curtis Turner ran the race using a number other than his usual #41. Both Junior Johnson and Lacy Jackson flipped in this race. Johnson would leave the race on lap 222 because he blew a tire and scraped the wall, spinning back into it hood first before flipping once, turning on the nose, and setting back down on the wheels. Meanwhile, Jackson would exit the race in a relatively quiet manner on lap 288. There were 35 lead changes made between four drivers (Buck Baker, Fonty Flock, Herb Thomas and Fireball Roberts). 16 year old Emory Lewis races in his first NASCAR race, who started 19th and finished 46th. This was impressive considering he barely was old enough to have a license, being eligible for just 11 months prior to this race.

Instead of being measured by the apron, the track surface started to be measured by the banking.

Dick Meyer - a native of Porterville, California - would die while street racing back in California just several days after competing in this event. Porterville would eventually bring two more to compete in NASCAR; 1973 Talladega 500 winner Dick Brooks and Marv Acton. Today, Acton is still involved in the stock car world, building NASCAR simulators and owning a shop dedicated to the fabrication of stock car vehicles.

Ned Jarrett was the last-place finisher due to a faulty oil line on lap 8 while Bob Hunter was the lowest-finishing driver to finish the race; 154 laps behind the lead lap drivers. After more than five hours, Buck Baker would defeat Fonty Flock by three laps; Baker would go on to win the 1960 Southern 500 and the 1964 Southern 500 to solidify himself as one of the toughest racers who has ever raced at Darlington.

Flock was the pole sitter at  during qualifying. Seventeen laps were run at reduced speeds as a result of the caution flag. Some of the notable owners in this race were Herb Thomas, Frank Christian and Bob Griffin. More than half the grid failed to finish; Herb Thomas had engine problems on lap 354 but ultimately earned a respectable fifth-place finish. Mike Magill flipped over the wall on lap 244 that caused him to finish in 34th after qualifying 20th.

Five drivers were declared to be "null" entries by NASCAR because they didn't submit their entry blanks within a reasonable period of time. While they were still permitted to race, their finishes did not count towards the overall season standings.

Individual race earnings for this event ranged from the winner's share of $6,285 ($ when adjusted for inflation) to the last-place finisher's portion of $100 ($ when adjusted for inflation) from a total of $24,430 ($ when adjusted for inflation). T.H. King, Boyce Hagler and Smokey Yunick were three notable crew chiefs that participated in this event.

Qualifying

Finishing order
Section reference:

 Buck Baker
 Fonty Flock
 Curtis Turner
 Dick Meyer
 Herb Thomas
 Jim Paschal
 Speedy Thompson
 Donald Thomas
 Dick Passwater
 Tim Flock
 Lee Petty
 Elton Hildreth
 Jimmie Lewallen
 Buddy Shuman
 Neil Roberts
 George Osborne
 Lloyd Hulette
 Gene Comstock
 Fred Dove
 Bobby Myers
 Bub King
 Tyre Rakestraw
 Gober Soseebee
 Bob Weatherly
 Lacy Jackson
 Johnny Bridgers
 Chet Williams
 Marvin Panch
 Elmer Cooper
 Arden Mounts
 Jim Reed
 Matt Gowan
 Bill Blair
 Mike Magill
 Bill Norton
 Otis Martin
 Bill Widenhouse
 Junior Johnson
 Weldon Adams
 J.L. Justice
 Bob Hunter
 Dick Rathmann
 Slick Smith
 Dick Allwine
 Fireball Roberts
 Emory Lewis
 Clyde Minter
 Ben Dixon
 Lonnie Bragg
 Laird Bruner
 Joe Guide
 Johnny Patterson
 Slim Rominger
 Ralph Liguori
 Gayle Warren
 Joe Eubanks
 Pop McGinnis
 Merritt Brown
 Ned Jarrett

References

Southern 500
Southern 500
NASCAR races at Darlington Raceway